The time zone in Ethiopia is East Africa Time (EAT) (UTC+03:00). The IANA time zone database identifier is Africa/Addis_Ababa.

Ethiopia does not observe daylight saving time.

Date and time notation
Almost all Ethiopians use a 12-hour clock system. The daytime cycle begins at dawn 12:00 (6:00:00 AM EAT) and ends at dusk 11:59:59 (5:59:59 PM EAT).
The night time cycle begins at dusk 12:00 (6:00:00 PM EAT) and ends at dawn 11:59:59 (5:59:59 AM EAT). The convention is that the day begins at 1:00 o'clock in the morning according to the 12 hour cycle (7:00 AM EAT) rather than midnight (12:00 AM EAT). Therefore, the local population could be said to effectively observe UTC-03:00 rather than UTC+03:00 in terms of the numbering of hours and their association with 24-hour days, with the exception of the hour from 6:00 AM EAT to 6:59 AM EAT.

, the 12-hour system remained common, despite pressure to follow international norms.

References

External links 

 Time in Ethiopia - Current Time Date in Ethiopia
 Time in Ethiopia - Local and International

 
Time in Eritrea